Darbqazi Rural District is a rural district (dehestan) in the Central District of Nishapur County, Razavi Khorasan province, Iran. At the 2006 census, its population was 10,411, in 2,721 families.  The rural district has 64 villages.

References 

Rural Districts of Razavi Khorasan Province
Nishapur County